Cathal Coughlan may refer to:

 Cathal Coughlan (politician) (1937–1986), Irish Fianna Fáil politician
 Cathal Coughlan (musician) (1960/1961–2022), Irish singer songwriter